Andrea Gabriela Noli Constantinescu (born 25 August 1972), known professionally as Andrea Noli, is a French-born Mexican actress of Romanian descent.

Life
She has participated in various telenovelas and theatrical productions. She is the daughter of pianist, Daniel Noli and Olga Constantinescu. She lived in Athens, Greece during the 80s where she attended high school in Ampelokipi district. As a student she was elected in the fifteen-member students association board. After school she moved to South America ending up in Mexico where she have lived her infant years. She has a daughter, Valentina, born on September 9, 2006, with actor Jorge Salinas.

Trajectory

2013 Vivir a Destiempo ... Sonia Duarte

2012 Amor Cautivo ...  Beatriz del Valle

2011 Cielo Rojo ...  Lucrecia Renteria 
  
2009 Pasión Morena ...  Silvia Rueda 
 
2008 Noche eterna ... Rosana 
 
2007 Se busca un hombre ...  Angélica Soler 
 
2006 Ni una vez más  … Dalia 
 
2005 Los Sánchez … Luciana 
 
2005 Top Models ...  Valeria 
 
2004 La Heredera  … Kauris 
 
2003 El poder del amor (
 
2002 Por tí ...  Andrea 
 
2001 Broken Hearts  ...  Mari Carmen 
 
2001 Nunca digas: Cuba? Jamás! (video) 
 
2001 El árbol de la horca 
 
2000 Golpe bajo 
 
2000 Catarino y los rurales 
 
2000 El tesoro del Pilar 
 
1999 Besos prohibidos ...  Basurto 
 
1999 Cuentas claras  ... Debbie Saunders 
 
1995 Acapulco, cuerpo y alma ...  Sandra 
 
1995 Si Dios me quita la vida

References

External links

1972 births
Living people
Actresses from Paris
French emigrants to Mexico
Mexican people of Romanian descent
Mexican people of Uruguayan descent
Mexican stage actresses
Mexican telenovela actresses